Federico Cesarano (5 July 1886 – 22 January 1969) was an Italian fencer and sport shooter. He won a bronze medal in the individual sabre event at the 1906 Intercalated Games. He also won the gold medal in the team sabre in the fencing at the 1920 Summer Olympics.

References

External links
 
 

1886 births
1969 deaths
Italian male fencers
Italian sabre fencers
Italian male sport shooters
Olympic fencers of Italy
Olympic shooters of Italy
Fencers at the 1906 Intercalated Games
Fencers at the 1920 Summer Olympics
Shooters at the 1924 Summer Olympics
Olympic bronze medalists for Italy
Olympic medalists in fencing
Medalists at the 1906 Intercalated Games
Olympic gold medalists for Italy